Highway 773 is a provincial highway in the Canadian province of Saskatchewan. It runs from Highway 38 near Chelan to Highway 35 near McKague. Highway 773 is about 37 km (23 mi.) long.

Highway 773 has a 4-km concurrency with Highway 679 near Pré-Ste-Marié.

See also 
Roads in Saskatchewan
Transportation in Saskatchewan

References 

773